Phoenix is a modern given name derived from the name for a mythological bird from Greek myth that has become a symbol of renewal, regeneration and immortality.  It is a name in use for both boys and girls.

Popularity
The name has been among the one thousand most popular names for boys in the United States since 1995 and among the top three hundred names for boys since 2017. It has been among the top one thousand names for American girls since 2003 and among the top three hundred names for American girls since 2020. It has been among the top five hundred most popular names for boys in England and Wales since 2004 and among the top two hundred since 2020. It has also been among the top one thousand names for boys in Australia and New Zealand in the past decade. It has been among the top five hundred names for girls in England and Wales since 2018.

Notes

Given names derived from birds